McFadden & Whitehead is the debut album of the R&B duo of the same name. The album peaked at #5 on the R&B charts and #23 on the Billboard 200. The lead single "Ain't No Stoppin' Us Now" topped the R&B charts, was #10 on the disco charts, and peaked at #13 on the Hot 100. The song "I've Been Pushed Aside" peaked at #73 R&B. The album was released in 1979.

Track listing
All songs were composed by Gene McFadden, John Whitehead and Jerry Cohen
 "Ain't No Stoppin' Us Now" 7:02
 "I've Been Pushed Aside" 5:14
 "Mr. Music" 5:10
 "Just Wanna Love You Baby" 3:58
 "Got to Change" 6:00
 "You're My Someone to Love" 4:36
 "I Got the Love" 3:33
 "Do You Want To Dance"  7:05

Single Listing
On Philadelphia International Records:

 ZS8-3681: Ain't No Stoppin' Us Now/I Got The Love
 ZS9-3704: Do You Want To Dance/Mr. Music
 ZS9-3725: I've Been Pushed Aside/You're My Someone To Love

Personnel
Gene McFadden - vocals
John Whitehead - vocals
Bobby Eli, Dennis Harris - guitar
James Williams - bass
Jerry Cohen - keyboards
Keith Benson - drums
Bobby Cupid, David Cruse, Don Renaldo - percussion
Barbara Ingram, Carla Benson, Evette Benson, The Futures - background vocals

References

1979 debut albums
Albums recorded at Sigma Sound Studios
Philadelphia International Records albums